The Hettangian is the earliest age and lowest stage of the Jurassic Period of the geologic timescale. It spans the time between 201.3 ± 0.2 Ma and 199.3 ± 0.3 Ma (million years ago).  The Hettangian follows the Rhaetian (part of the Triassic Period) and is followed by the Sinemurian.

In European stratigraphy the Hettangian is a part of the time span in which the Lias was deposited. An example is the British Blue Lias, which has an upper Rhaetian to Sinemurian age. Another example is the lower Lias from the Northern Limestone Alps where well-preserved but very rare ammonites, including Alsatites, have been found.

Stratigraphic definitions
The Hettangian was introduced in the literature by Swiss palaeontologist, Eugène Renevier, in 1864. The stage takes its name from Hettange-Grande, a town in north-eastern France, just south of the border with Luxembourg on the main road from Luxembourg City to Metz.

The base of the Hettangian Stage (which is also the base of the Lower Jurassic Series and the entire Jurassic System) is defined as the place in the stratigraphic column where fossils of the ammonite genus Psiloceras first appear. A global reference profile (a GSSP) for the base was defined 2010 for an exposure of the Kendlbach Formation at the Kuhjoch section in the Karwendel Mountains of western Austria. The top of the Hettangian Stage (the base of the Sinemurian) is at the first appearances of ammonite genera Vermiceras and Metophioceras.

Biostratigraphy
The Hettangian contains three ammonite biozones in the Tethys domain:
zone of Schlotheimia angulata
zone of Alsatites liasicus
zone of Psiloceras planorbis

See also 
 Triassic-Jurassic extinction event
 Komlosaurus carbonis

References

Notes

Literature
; 2004: A Geologic Time Scale 2004, Cambridge University Press.
: Notices géologiques et paléontologiques sur les Alpes Vaudoises, et les régions environnantes. I. Infralias et Zone à Avicula contorta (Étage Rhaetien) des Alpes Vaudoises Bulletin de la Société Vaudoise des Sciences Naturelles 8, p. 39-97.

External links
GeoWhen Database - Hettangian
Lower Jurassic timescale, at the website of the subcommission for stratigraphic information of the ICS
Stratigraphic chart of the Lower Jurassic, at the website of Norges Network of offshore records of geology and stratigraphy

 
01
Geological ages